Şişhane is an underground station on the M2 line of the Istanbul Metro. The station is located under Meşrutiyet Street in Beyoğlu, Istanbul. Şişhane has an entrance to Istanbul's famous İstiklâl Caddesi as well as entrances to Kasımpaşa. An out-of-station interchange is available with the historic Tünel funicular line as well as the T2 tram line. Many city buses that run along Tarlabaşı Boulevard are just a few blocks away from Şişhane's Kasımpaşa portal. Şişhane was opened on 31 January 2009 along with Atatürk Oto Sanayi on the northern part of the line. Between 2009-14 trains from Şişhane would operate as a shuttle to Taksim and back. When the M2 was extended south to Yenikapı in 2014, trains operated normally traversing the full line.

Layout

References

Railway stations opened in 2009
Istanbul metro stations
Beyoğlu
2009 establishments in Turkey